Karkinits’ka zatóka State Zakaznik (Karkinit Bay Sanctuary) is an ornithology zakaznik (protected area) located in the Karkinit Bay, Black Sea, between the southwestern Crimean Peninsula and mainland Ukraine. It was named after the early Greek settlement of Karkinit on the Crimean coast in place of Yevpatoria. Translated from Greek, the name means "little or small crab".

It juts to dry land on 118,5 km. The depth in the western part is up to 36 m and in the east to 10 m. The length of the bay is about 120 thousand kilometers.

The Bay is limited with the mainland and Dzharylgatskaya Spit from the North, and Tarkhankut Peninsula from the South. The Bay has two bays for ships coasting trade: they are the Dzharylgatsky Bay and Ak-Mechetskaya Bay.

Razdolnoye Crimean region is situated on the coast of the Karkinit Bay. The area offers a nature reserve of international destination - Swan Islands, with an area of approximately 10 hectares and a length of about eight kilometers. They are rise above the sea level on 2 meters.

Islands, which are surrounded by Karkinit's Bay shallow water and plenty of plant and animal food, attract a large number of waterfowl. There are more than 240 species of them: cormorants, herons, gulls, ducks, etc.. Shypun and Klykun swans are the pride of the islands. Stryguscheye and Portovoe villages are the perfect places to stay for the rest and recreation. Also, the bays Uzkaya, Yarylgachskaya, Bakalskaya and Perekopskaya are the part of Karkinit Bay.

The mail qualities of Karkinit Bay are the vast territory of sand and shell beaches, mild climate, desert and sea spaces.

In 1979 the Karkinits’ka State Ornithological Reserve of National Importance is created on this territory (the area of 27 646 ha). The reserve has a mission to preserve the gene pool of the local flora and fauna, and also to protect the unique communities of wildlife. It is a resting place for migratory waterfowl in spring and autumn, and the habitat of nomadic birds in the winter.

Sources 
 http://ukraina-krym.com/index/0-19
 https://web.archive.org/web/20140107182706/http://www.nedaleko.ua/sight/
 http://www.megabook.ru/Article.asp?AID=637970

Geography of Crimea
Ramsar sites in Ukraine